The Ribenboim Prize, named in honour of Paulo Ribenboim, is awarded by the Canadian Number Theory Association for distinguished research in number theory by a mathematician who is Canadian or has close connections to Canadian mathematics.  Normally the winner will have received their Ph.D. in the last 12 years. The winner is expected to give a plenary talk at the award ceremony.

Winners

See also

 List of mathematics awards

References

Mathematics awards
Canadian awards
Awards established in 1999
.
1999 establishments in Canada